Alan Khamidovich Lelyukayev (born 13 November 1999) is a Russian football player. He plays for FC Dynamo Makhachkala.

Club career
He made his debut in the Russian Professional Football League for PFC Spartak Nalchik on 24 May 2016 in a game against FC Terek-2 Grozny.

He made his Russian Football National League debut for FC Avangard Kursk on 13 July 2019 in a game against FC Khimki.

References

External links
 

1999 births
Living people
Russian footballers
Association football defenders
PFC Spartak Nalchik players
FC Avangard Kursk players
FC Neftekhimik Nizhnekamsk players
FC SKA Rostov-on-Don players
FC Dynamo Makhachkala players
Russian First League players
Russian Second League players